Beeston Tor is a limestone cliff in Staffordshire.  It overlooks the confluence of the River Hamps with the River Manifold, and is a popular venue for rock climbing (seasonal restrictions for rock climbing apply).

There was a small station here, of the same name, opened by the narrow gauge (2' 6") Leek and Manifold Valley Light Railway on 27 June 1904, whilst being entirely operated by the North Staffordshire Railway. The station had no siding – unlike most of the stations on the line –  but there was a refreshment room.

The line closed in 1934, and the route of the railway past the station is now designated the Manifold Way, an 8-mile walk- and cycle-path which runs from Waterhouses to Hulme End.

References

Disused railway stations in Staffordshire
Cliffs of England
Landforms of Staffordshire